Martin Hebner (10 November 1959 – 7 July 2021) was a German politician for the populist Alternative for Germany (AfD) and from 2017 member of the Bundestag.

Biography
Hebner was born in 1959 in the West German city of Frankfurt am Main and became an IT-consultant.

Hebner entered the newly founded AfD in 2013 and became 'Schriftführer' (recording clerk) of the party state organisation in Bavaria.

Hebner became member of the Bundestag after the 2017 German federal election and was considered to be part of the right-wing faction Flügel (wing) of the AfD.

References

1959 births
2021 deaths
Politicians from Frankfurt
Members of the Bundestag for Bavaria
Members of the Bundestag 2017–2021
Members of the Bundestag for the Alternative for Germany